Ricardo Osorio Mendoza (born 30 March 1980) is a Mexican former professional footballer who played as a defender.

Club career

Early career
Born in Huajuapan de León, Oaxaca, Osorio made his debut in the Primera División de México in 2001–02 season with Cruz Azul in a match against Atlante F.C., with a 3–1 victory.

VfB Stuttgart
After an outstanding performance at the 2006 FIFA World Cup, Osorio signed a four-year, £4 million deal with German club VfB Stuttgart.

He scored his first goal in the Bundesliga for Stuttgart on 16 February 2007. The goal came at the 44th minute of the match against Eintracht Frankfurt. Stuttgart went on to win the game 4–0. On 19 May 2007, Stuttgart defeated Energie Cottbus 2–1, winning the Bundesliga, with Osorio making one of the highest number of appearances for the season.

On 2 May 2010, Stuttgart president Erwin Staudt announced that Osorio would be leaving the club on a Bosman transfer.

Monterrey
On 5 July 2010, he returned to Mexico after four years in Germany, signing for Monterrey. In his debut season, Monterrey won the Apertura 2010 championship, beating Santos Laguna in the final. They also won the CONCACAF Champions League, beating MLS club Real Salt Lake in the final.

International career
Osorio won his first international cap for Mexico playing in the finals of the CONCACAF Gold Cup tournament against Brazil on 13 July 2003, winning 1–0. Osorio scored his first international goal on 7 July 2004 in a 2–2 draw against Uruguay in the 2004 Copa América.

In the 2005 FIFA Confederations Cup, Osorio missed a penalty in the semi-final which resulted in Mexico being eliminated. Osorio was selected in his country's squad for the 2006 FIFA World Cup in Germany, where he appeared in all four of Mexico's matches.

On 21 June 2007, Osorio played for Mexico against Guadeloupe in the CONCACAF Gold Cup tournament. After the match, he announced that he would not participate in the Copa América tournament, due to overloaded work schedules with his club, who would also play in the 2007–08 Champions League. He stated that he and teammate Pável Pardo had not taken any holiday break since the World Cup in Germany. Stuttgart coach Armin Veh was satisfied to hear this news and sent his thanks to national team coach Hugo Sánchez for letting the players rest and take a vacation.

Osorio played all four matches for Mexico at the 2010 FIFA World Cup in South Africa.

Career statistics

Club

International

International goals

Honours
VfB Stuttgart
Bundesliga: 2006–07

Monterrey
Mexican Primera División: Apertura 2010
CONCACAF Champions League: 2010–11, 2011–12, 2012–13

Mexico
CONCACAF Gold Cup: 2003, 2011

Individual
CONCACAF Gold Cup Best XI: 2003
Mexican Primera División Special Recognition Award: Clausura 2007

References

External links 
 
 
 
 

1980 births
Living people
Footballers from Oaxaca
Indigenous Mexicans
Association football defenders
Mexico international footballers
CONCACAF Gold Cup-winning players
2003 CONCACAF Gold Cup players
2004 Copa América players
2005 FIFA Confederations Cup players
2005 CONCACAF Gold Cup players
2006 FIFA World Cup players
2007 CONCACAF Gold Cup players
2010 FIFA World Cup players
2011 CONCACAF Gold Cup players
Liga MX players
Cruz Azul footballers
C.F. Monterrey players
Mexican expatriate footballers
Expatriate footballers in Germany
Bundesliga players
VfB Stuttgart players
Mexican expatriate sportspeople in Germany
People from Huajuapan de León
Mexican footballers